Torghundi, also spelled Turghundi or Towrgondi, is a border town in northern Herat Province of Afghanistan. The town's main attraction is the Torghundi custom house and border checkpoint, which officially connects Afghanistan by road with Turkmenistan. Torghundi is the second checkpoint and border crossing between the two countries, with Aqina to the northeast being the other. Torghundi is connected by both a regular road and a 1520 mm gauge railroad with the neighboring town of Serhetabat in Turkmenistan.

The railroad at Torghundi was originally established in 1960 as a single track, and was upgraded in 2017. Torghundi has become the starting point of the Lapis Lazuli trade corridor.

It also serves as one of the official border crossings between the people of Afghanistan and Turkmenistan. Security in and around the town is provided by the Afghan National Security Forces, which includes the Afghan Border Force. The town fell to Taliban forces in July 2021, as part of the wider 2021 Taliban offensive. Every visitor or traveler between Afghanistan and Turkmenistan is required to possess a valid travel visa.

Name 
The name Torghundi means Dark Hill or Black Hill in Pashto language.

Climate
With an influence from the local steppe climate, Torghundi features a cold semi-arid climate (BSk) under the Köppen climate classification. The average temperature in Toraghundi is 15.8 °C, while the annual precipitation averages 300 mm.

July is the hottest month of the year with an average temperature of 28.5 °C. The coldest month January has an average temperature of 3.4 °C.

See also 
Afghanistan–Turkmenistan border
Afghanistan–Turkmenistan relations
Aqina (second border crossing between Afghanistan and Turkmenistan)
Islam Qala (border crossing between Afghanistan and Iran)
Hairatan (border crossing between Afghanistan and Uzbekistan)
Sher Khan Bandar (border crossing between Afghanistan and Tajikistan)
Turkmenistan–Afghanistan–Pakistan–India Pipeline (TAPI)

References

External links 
 
 

Populated places in Herat Province
Afghanistan–Turkmenistan border crossings